Alexandria (on the) Hyphasis was the name of the fortress on the west bank of the Hyphasis (Beas) river at which Alexander the Great stopped on 31 Aug 326 BCE in the course of his Indian campaign. It was on the eastern border of Alexander's empire. Today, it is near Amritsar, part of Punjab, India.

Alexander's army, exhausted, homesick, and anxious by the prospects of having to further face large Indian armies throughout the Indo-Gangetic Plain, mutinied at the Hyphasis river and refused to march further east. Alexander, after a meeting with his officer, Coenus, and after hearing about the lament of his soldiers, eventually relented, being convinced that it was better to return.

Notes

Former populated places in India
Bactrian and Indian Hellenistic period
Tells (archaeology)
Cities founded by Alexander the Great
Populated places established in the 4th century BC

320s BC establishments